Clanchy is a surname. Notable people with the surname include:

John Clanchy (born 1943), Australian novelist and short story writer
Kate Clanchy (born 1965), Scottish poet, freelance writer, and teacher
Michael Clanchy (1936–2021), British medievalist

See also
Clancy